"Idiot Grin" is a song by Australian rock/pop group Do-Re-Mi released by Virgin Records in August 1985 as the second single from their debut studio album. The song peaked at number 43 in Australia.

Track listing
All tracks were written by Deborah Conway, Dorland Bray, Helen Carter and Stephen Philip.
"Idiot Grin" - 2:26
"No Fury" - 2:58

Charts

Personnel
Do-Ré-Mi members
Dorland Bray — drums, percussion, backing vocals
Helen Carter — bass guitar, backing vocals
Deborah Conway — lead vocalist
Steve Hogarth — keyboards
Stephen Philip — guitar
Additional musicians
Roger Freeman — trombone

Recording details
Producer, engineer — Gavin MacKillop
Assistant engineer — Chris Potter, Mike Bigwood, Steve Chase
Studio — Townhouse III Studios, London

Art work
Cover — Greg Hollister (front cover illustration), Shelley Conway (lino cuts)

References

1985 singles
Do-Re-Mi (band) songs
1985 songs
Virgin Records singles